Dowsett may refer to:

Alex Dowsett (born 1988), English professional cyclist, currently riding for Movistar Team
Charles Dowsett (1924–1998), Professor of Armenian at Oxford University
Dickie Dowsett (born 1931), English professional footballer
John Dowsett, Australian judge
Phil Dowsett (born 1951), British racing driver

See also
Dowsett, Papua New Guinea, suburb of Lae